Marco Antonio Lazaga Dávalos, (born 26 February 1983 in Nanawa) is a football striker from Paraguay.

Career
Lazaga started his career with Club 2 de Mayo of Pedro Juan Caballero, before signing with the Argentine side Belgrano of Córdoba. In 2008, he returned to Paraguay to play in the Apertura tournament for Sportivo Luqueño. Lazaga also signed with Olimpia to play in the Clausura tournament, at the request of coach Gustavo Costas. In 2010 Lazaga went abroad to play for Chilean club Cobreloa. After a good year with the zorros he transferred to Belgrano de Córdoba in Argentina, but after a short stint he returned to Chilean football with Everton de Viña del Mar. In 2012 Lazaga joined Colombian side Patriotas F.C. where he had good season. In 2013, he continued playing abroad having brief spells in Peru and Bolivia with León de Huánuco and Club Blooming respectively.

He went to jail to drive his junk yellow mercedez drunk. See http://www.abc.com.py/nacionales/futbolista-ebrio-intenta-agredir-a-agentes-de-transito-1255364.html

External links
 
 Marco Lazaga – Stats in Argentina at Fútbol XXI  
 

1983 births
Living people
Paraguayan footballers
Paraguayan expatriate footballers
Sportivo Luqueño players
General Caballero Sport Club footballers
Club Atlético Belgrano footballers
Club Olimpia footballers
2 de Mayo footballers
Cobreloa footballers
Everton de Viña del Mar footballers
Club Blooming players
León de Huánuco footballers
Cúcuta Deportivo footballers
Paraguayan Primera División players
Primera B de Chile players
Chilean Primera División players
Peruvian Primera División players
Categoría Primera A players
Bolivian Primera División players
Expatriate footballers in Chile
Expatriate footballers in Argentina
Expatriate footballers in Colombia
Expatriate footballers in Peru
Expatriate footballers in Bolivia
Association football forwards